The 1999 Grand Prix of Las Vegas was the eighth and final round of the 1999 American Le Mans Series season.  It took place at Las Vegas Motor Speedway, Nevada, on November 7, 1999.

Race results
Class winners in bold.

Statistics
 Pole Position - #1 Panoz Motor Sports - 1:07.404
 Fastest Lap - #1 Panoz Motor Sports - 1:09.210
 Distance - 
 Average Speed -

References
 
 

Las Vegas
Grand Prix of Las Vegas
1999 in sports in Nevada